Adam Davis is a former Australian rules football field umpire in the Australian Football League. He has umpired 39 career games in the AFL.

Davis won the 2003 Umpire of the Year award for the AFL Queensland Umpires Association.

Players were officially warned about bumping into umpires after Brisbane Lions captain Michael Voss shoved Carlton captain Anthony Koutoufides into Davis during the 2005 AFL season. This resparking an extended debate about the protection of umpires in the AFL.

Footnotes

Australian Football League umpires
Year of birth missing (living people)
Living people